This is a list of the records issued by American band Love.

Studio albums

Live albums

 1980: Love Live - live, 1978 concert
 1982: Studio / Live - second side live from a 1970 concert
 2003: The Forever Changes Concert
 2003: Electrifically Speaking - Live in Concert
 2003: Back on the Scene - live at My Place, Santa Monica in 1991
 2010: Arthur Lee and Love - Live in Paris 1992
 2015: Coming Through to You: The Live Recording (1970-2004)
 2017: Complete "Forever Changes" Live

Compilation albums

 1970: Love Revisited (Elektra)
 1973: Love Elektra Masters (Elektra)
 1980: The Best of Love (Rhino, 2003 expanded version on CD)
 1988: Out There (Ace/Big Beat)
 1992: Love Comes in Colours (Raven)
 1995: Love Story 1966-1972 (Rhino)
 2005: Rhino Hi-Five: Love (Rhino)
 2006: Love: The Definitive Rock Collection (Elektra/Rhino)
 2007: The Blue Thumb Recordings (Hip-O Select, Geffen Records)
 2014: Love Songs: An Anthology of Arthur Lee's Love (Salvo)

Singles and EPs

Notes

References

External links
 Love discography at Discogs

Discographies of American artists